Patodi is a village in the Bhiwani district of the Indian state of Haryana. , the village had 548 households with a population of 3,043 of which 1,618 were male and 1,425 female.

References

Villages in Bhiwani district